Sylwia Matuszczyk (born 11 June 1992) is a Polish handball player for MKS Lublin and the Polish national team.

She participated at the 2018 European Women's Handball Championship.

Achievements
Ekstraklasa:
Winner: 2018
EHF Challenge Cup:
Winner: 2018

References

1992 births
Living people
People from Żory
Polish female handball players
21st-century Polish women